In the Presence of a Clown is a television film by Ingmar Bergman, recorded for Swedish television in 1997 with Bergman as a director. It was screened in the Un Certain Regard section of the 1998 Cannes Film Festival. It tells the story of a professor named Carl, who has been found guilty of attempted murder and sentenced to treatment in a mental ward. In the hospital he befriends a man named Osvald, and they attempt to make and promote a film.

The film was produced for Sveriges Television from Bergman's 1994 play of the same title.

Cast
Börje Ahlstedt – Uncle Carl Åkerblom 
Marie Richardson – Pauline Thibault 
Erland Josephson – Osvald Vogler 
Pernilla August – Karin Bergman 
Anita Björk –  Anna Åkerblom 
Agneta Ekmanner – Rigmor the clown 
Lena Endre – Märta Lundberg 
Gunnel Fred – Emma Vogler 
Gerthi Kulle – Sister Stella 
Johan Lindell – Johan Egerman 
Peter Stormare – Petrus Landahl 
Folke Asplund – Fredrik Blom 
Anna Björk – Mia Falk 
Inga Landgré – Alma Berglund 
Alf Nilsson – Stefan Larsson

References

External links

1997 television films
1997 films
Films based on works by Ingmar Bergman
Films directed by Ingmar Bergman
Swedish television films
1990s Swedish-language films
1997 drama films
Films set in Uppsala
1990s Swedish films